Saint-Hilaire-de-Chaléons is a commune in the Loire-Atlantique department in western France.

Transport

Saint-Hilaire-de-Chaléons station is served by train services between Pornic and Nantes.

See also
Communes of the Loire-Atlantique department

References

Sainthilairedechaleons
Pornic Agglo Pays de Retz